Saleem Khan is a Pakistani politician who had been a Member of the Provincial Assembly of Khyber Pakhtunkhwa, from 2008 to May 2018.

Early life and education
He was born on 6 June 1968 in Garam Chashma, Chitral District.

He has a degree in Bachelor of Education and a degree in Master of Arts.

Political career
He was elected to the Provincial Assembly of the North-West Frontier Province as a candidate of Pakistan Peoples Party (PPP) from Constituency PF-89 (Chitral-I) in 2008 Pakistani general election. He received 12,960 votes and defeated a candidate of Muttahida Majlis-e-Amal.

He was re-elected to the Provincial Assembly of Khyber Pakhtunkhwa as a candidate of PPP from Constituency PK-89 (Chitral-I) in 2013 Pakistani general election. He received 11,418 votes and defeated a candidate of All Pakistan Muslim League.

Electoral history

2018

References

Living people
Khyber Pakhtunkhwa MPAs 2013–2018
Pakistan People's Party politicians
1968 births
Khyber Pakhtunkhwa MPAs 2008–2013